The  is an electric multiple unit (EMU) commuter train type operated by the Tokyo Metropolitan Bureau of Transportation (Toei) on the Toei Mita Line in Tokyo, Japan. Introduced into service on 23 June 1993, a total of 37 six-car trainsets (222 vehicles) were built by Kawasaki Heavy Industries and Kinki Sharyo between 1993 and 2000 to replace the non-air-conditioned Toei 6000 series.

Formations
The fleet consists of 37 six-car sets formed as shown below, with car 1 at the Nishi-Takashimadaira end.

Cars 2 and 5 are each fitted with two lozenge-type pantographs.

Interior
Seating consists of longitudinal bench seating with sculpted seat cushions, and 4-seat transverse bays are provided at the ends of cars.

History
The first sets were delivered in May 1993, and entered revenue service from 23 June of the same year; the original purpose of the Toei 6300 series was to replace the non-air-conditioned Toei 6000 series. In 2000, the third batch of the 6300 series was delivered for through-service operations into the Tōkyū Meguro Line as it was more economical to replace the remaining 6000 series units than to modify them. With the installation of a new digital radio system for the Toyoko and Meguro Lines, all remaining first and second batches were retired early from service in late October 2022.

Future 
Toei plans to replace the first and second batches of the fleet with new 6500 series 8-car sets from 14 May 2022. The third batch will remain in service, however Toei had expressed interest in completely replacing the entire fleet with new 6500 trainsets as extending the remaining sets to eight car formations and updating them to be compatible with future through running service on the Sotetsu line via the Shin-Yokohama line would be rather costly. For the time being, the third batch sets will only provide service as far as Hiyoshi and remain as six car sets.

Gallery

References

Electric multiple units of Japan
Toei Subway
Train-related introductions in 1993
Kawasaki multiple units
Kinki Sharyo multiple units
1500 V DC multiple units of Japan